Harold Richardson Laycoe (June 23, 1922 – April 29, 1998) was a Canadian ice hockey defenceman and coach. He played in the National Hockey League (NHL) with the New York Rangers, Montreal Canadiens, and Boston Bruins between 1945 and 1956. After his playing career he became a coach, working as both a coach and general manager in the Western Hockey League between 1956 and 1969. He coached the Los Angeles Kings of the NHL for the first part of the 1969–70 season, and in 1970 became the inaugural coach of the Vancouver Canucks, spending two seasons as coach and a final season as the general manager in 1973–74.

Playing career
Laycoe grew up in rural Sutherland, Saskatchewan. He played junior hockey in Saskatoon, but his dreams of turning pro in the sport were interrupted by World War II. Laycoe served in the Royal Canadian Navy and played on travelling teams while completing his military service. He started his National Hockey League career with the New York Rangers after signing with this team in 1945.

In 1947, Laycoe joined the Montreal Canadiens. Despite wearing eyeglasses during games due to his vision, Laycoe gained a reputation as one of the most physical players in the league. However, he struggled to find playing time on an exceptionally deep team. He was a midseason trade acquisition by the Boston Bruins in 1951, and he received an increased number of minutes on the blue line with his new club. His high stick on and subsequent fight with French-Canadian superstar Maurice Richard was the catalyst for the infamous Richard Riot. Laycoe retired after the 1955-1956 season.

Coaching career

Laycoe coached the New Westminster Royals of the Western Hockey League in 1956–57 and remained with the franchise when it moved to Portland, Oregon for the 1960–1961 season and was renamed the Portland Buckaroos. The Buckaroos won the league championship Lester Patrick Cup its first year in existence. Laycoe coached the Buckaroos for nine seasons and won another league championship in 1964–1965. During the 9 Buckaroo years, Laycoe led them to more victories(362) than any other professional team. In 1969, Laycoe moved to the National Hockey League, coaching the Los Angeles Kings for part of one season and then moving on to the expansion Vancouver Canucks for two more seasons. He later coached the Dutch national team in the 1977 B Pool World Championships.He continued to live in Vancouver after leaving the Canuck's management. His final position in hockey was as a scout with the New York Islanders. The Islanders gave team Stanley Cup rings to Laycoe after each of their 1980 to 1984 Stanley Cup wins.

In 1984, he was named to the Oregon Sports Hall of Fame.

Although his hometown of Sutherland became annexed into Saskatoon, Laycoe Crescent, Court, Lane and Terrace in the city's Silverspring subdivision is named in his honor.

Career statistics

Regular season and playoffs

Coaching record

References

External links
 

1922 births
1998 deaths
Boston Bruins players
Canadian expatriate ice hockey players in the United States
Canadian ice hockey coaches
Canadian ice hockey defencemen
Canadian military personnel of World War II
Ice hockey people from Saskatchewan
Los Angeles Kings coaches
Montreal Canadiens players
New York Rangers players
New York Rovers players
Ontario Hockey Association Senior A League (1890–1979) players
Sportspeople from Saskatoon
Vancouver Canucks coaches
Vancouver Canucks general managers